União Futebol Clube, commonly known as Os Pastilhas, is a Portuguese sports club based in Cova da Piedade, Almada. The club is best known for its football and futsal teams.

Its futsal team is best known as the first club of Luís Figo, widely regarded as one of the greatest Portuguese footballers of all time.

References

External links
 Profile at ZeroZero
 Profile at ForaDeJogo

1972 establishments in Portugal
Association football clubs established in 1972
Football clubs in Portugal